Vai Que Cola: O Filme is a 2015 Brazilian comedy film based on the television series Vai Que Cola. It was released on October 1, 2015.

Plot

Valdomiro Lacerda moves to Leblon.

Cast

Paulo Gustavo as Valdomiro Lacerda

Reception
The film was number-one on its opening weekend, with R$8.3 million.

References

External links

2015 comedy films
Brazilian comedy films
Films based on television series
2010s Portuguese-language films